Nyceryx furtadoi is a moth of the  family Sphingidae. It is known from Brazil, Bolivia and Paraguay. It is possibly also found in Argentina.

The wingspan is about 60 mm. It can be distinguished from all other Nyceryx species by the relatively uniform pale brown ground colour of the forewing upperside, on which the transverse lines form a conspicuous striped pattern, and the oversized discal spots.

Adults are probably on wing year round and have been recorded from September to October in Brazil and in August in Paraguay.

References

Nyceryx
Moths described in 1996